Albert Fowler (September 7, 1802 – April 12, 1883) was an American pioneer and politician.

Fowler was born to Elijah Fowler and his wife in Tyringham, Massachusetts.  After his father's death, Fowler's mother and his family moved to Chautauqua County, New York.

In 1832 Fowler moved to Chicago, where he stayed briefly before moving to Milwaukee, Wisconsin, on November 18, 1833. There he worked as a clerk for Solomon Juneau. As there were few white settlers yet in the area, Fowler learned the Potawatomi and Menominee languages. His Native American acquaintances knew him as Mis-kee-o-quoneu, or "Red Cap," for his preferred head covering.

Fowler was appointed as the first clerk for the newly formed Milwaukee County in 1835. At the same time, he was made a justice of the peace. He was a member of the second (and only successful) Wisconsin state constitutional convention in 1847. Fowler moved to the town of Wauwatosa in 1839.

In 1856, Fowler moved to Rockford, Illinois, where he lived until his death. While living in Rockford, he served as its mayor for three terms.

References
Horace Addison Tenney, David Atwood. Memorial record of the fathers of Wisconsin Madison, Wisconsin: David Atwood, 1880. pp. 216–19. 
Memoirs of Milwaukee County : from the earliest historical times down to the present, including a genealogical and biographical record of representative families in Milwaukee County. Madison, Wisconsin: Western Historical Association, 1909. . pp. 51–53. Reprinted by La Crosse, Wisconsin: Brookhaven Press, 2000.

People from Tyringham, Massachusetts
Mayors of Rockford, Illinois
1802 births
1883 deaths
County officials in Wisconsin
19th-century American politicians